Wilson Tower is a skyscraper in Asuncion, Paraguay. With 107 meters, it is currently the second tallest building in Paraguay. It is surpassed by 29 meters and 4 stories by the Icono Tower, also in Asuncion.

References

Skyscrapers in Asunción